Live Acoustic America is an acoustic live recording of classic Howard Jones songs, released in 1996. It was recorded in Los Angeles to a sell-out crowd and features Carol Steele on percussion. The acoustic tour travelled the world, with Jones playing venues in Europe, the USA and Jamaica. The tour accompanied the release of the piano-based album In the Running and featured pared-back versions of his hits, album tracks, and The Beatles cover "Come Together".

Track listing
"Intro/Pearl in the Shell" - 3:44
"Don't Always Look At The Rain" - 2:56
"Fallin' Away" - 4:25
"Exodus/Come Together" - 5:29
"You Know I Love You... Don't You?" - 2:59
"Out Of Thin Air" - 3:00
"One Last Try" - 3:55
"Like to Get to Know You Well" - 4:42
"City Song" - 5:02
"Lift Me Up" - 3:35
"Tape To Tape Rag" - 1:19
"Everlasting Love" - 5:56
"Life in One Day" - 6:18
"Things Can Only Get Better" - 5:01
"What Is Love?" - 4:17
"New Song" - 3:24
"No One Is to Blame" - 5:07

References 
 

Howard Jones (English musician) albums
1996 live albums